The Minnesota Wild are a professional ice hockey team based in Saint Paul, Minnesota. The Wild competes in the National Hockey League (NHL) as a member of the Central Division in the Western Conference and play their home games at the Xcel Energy Center.

The Wild were founded on June 25, 1997, but did not start playing until the 2000–01 season. They were the first NHL franchise in Minnesota since the Minnesota North Stars moved to Dallas, Texas in 1993. They lost their first game 3–1 to the Mighty Ducks of Anaheim, and recorded their first win against the Tampa Bay Lightning five games later. In the 2002–03 season, the team made their first Stanley Cup playoffs appearance, making a surprising run to the Western Conference Finals.

History

Preparations of a new franchise
Following the departure of the Minnesota North Stars after the 1992–93 season, the state of Minnesota was without an NHL team for seven seasons. Saint Paul mayor (and future U.S. Senator) Norm Coleman began a campaign to either recruit the relocation of an existing franchise to the city or the award of an expansion franchise to a Minnesota-based ownership group. These efforts came close to success in the mid-1990s when Minnesota interests purchased the original Winnipeg Jets intending to relocate the franchise to Minnesota; however, arena negotiations at the Target Center fell through, and the Jets instead relocated to Phoenix, Arizona.

Following the failed attempt to relocate the Jets, the NHL announced its intention to expand from 26 to 30 teams. Businessman and Minnetonka native Bob Naegele, Jr. became the lead investor for an application to the NHL for an expansion franchise and, ultimately, the first majority owner. On June 25, 1997, the National Hockey League (NHL) announced that Minnesota had been awarded an expansion franchise, to begin play in the 2000–01 season. The six finalist team names for the new NHL franchise (Blue Ox, Freeze, Northern Lights, Voyageurs, White Bears, and Wild), were announced on November 20, 1997. Jac Sperling was named chief executive officer of the Minnesota team, Doug Risebrough was named general manager, Tod Leiweke was named President, and Martha Fuller was named chief financial officer.

The team was officially named the Wild at an unveiling at the Aldrich Area on January 22, 1998, with the song "Born to Be Wild" by Steppenwolf playing over the arena's speaker system. The Minnesota Wild announced its first major sponsorship agreement with MasterCard from First USA. It was the earliest that First USA had ever signed an agreement before a team began play (31 months). The State of Minnesota adopted legislation in April 1998 to loan $65 million to the City of Saint Paul to fund 50% of the estimated $130 million project costs for the Xcel Energy Center in Saint Paul. The legislation also provided that only $48 million of the loan needed to be repaid if the team met the requirements to have an agreement in place during the lease term with the Minnesota Amateur Sports Commission. The City of Saint Paul issued an additional $65 million in bonds, with roughly 90% of the debt service on the bonds and the repayment of the state loan coming from scheduled rent and payment instead of taxes from the Minnesota Wild. Deconstruction of the Saint Paul Civic Center began soon after. Designs were announced for the Xcel Energy Center and a groundbreaking ceremony for the Xcel Energy Center was hosted in Saint Paul.

The Minnesota Wild announced a 26-year partnership agreement with the Minnesota Amateur Sports Commission (MASC). The Minnesota Wild-MASC partnership is the first partnership of its kind between a private professional sports team and a public amateur sports organization. Doug Risebrough was named executive vice president/general manager of Minnesota Wild and the Xcel Energy Center was completed and ready for use.

Early years and (2000–2009)

Marian Gaborik era

The Wild named Jacques Lemaire their first head coach and the team picked Marian Gaborik third overall in the first round of the 2000 NHL Entry Draft. Gaborik scored the first-ever goal for the Wild in their franchise debut on October 6 at Anaheim. The Wild played their first-ever home game on October 11 against the Philadelphia Flyers and skated to a 3–3 tie. Minnesota native Darby Hendrickson scored the first-ever home goal for the Wild. The most notable game of the year was the first visit of the Dallas Stars, who had formerly played in Minnesota as the Minnesota North Stars. The Wild rode an emotional sellout crowd of over 18,000 to a 6–0 shutout in Dallas' first regular-season game in Minnesota since a neutral-site game in 1993. The season ended with Scott Pellerin as the leading scorer with 39 points while Wes Walz, Darby Hendrickson and Gaborik paced the team with 18 goals each.

The Wild got off to a strong start in the 2001–02 season by earning at least one point in its first seven games. However, the Wild finished in last place again with a record of 26–35–12–6. En route, there were signs the Wild were improving, as second-year speedster Gaborik had a solid sophomore season with 30 goals, including an invite to the NHL YoungStars Game, and Andrew Brunette led the team in scoring with 69 points.

Gaborik spent much of the 2002–03 season vying for the league scoring crown before slumping in the second half, and the Wild, in their first-ever playoff appearance, made it to the Western Conference Finals before being swept 4–0 by the Mighty Ducks of Anaheim. Previously, the Wild had beaten the favored and third-seeded Colorado Avalanche in the first round in seven games, coming back from a 3–1 series deficit and winning both Game 6 and 7 in overtime. Brunette scored the series-clinching goal, the last on Patrick Roy. In the Western Conference semi-finals, the Wild beat the fourth-seeded Vancouver Canucks, again in seven games, and again after being down 3–1 in a series. In the process, the Wild became the first team in playoff history to capture a seven-game series twice after facing elimination during Game 5.

When the 2003–04 season started, the Wild were short-handed with both Pascal Dupuis and Gaborik holding out. After struggling in the first month, the Wild finally got their two young star left-wingers signed, but both struggled to get back into game shape as the Wild struggled through much of November. In a deep hole, the Wild did not make it to the playoffs, despite finishing the season strong, with wins in five of their last six games as they finished last in the competitive Northwest Division with a record of 30–29–20–3. Along the way, the Wild began to gear up for the future, trading away several of their older players who were a part of the franchise from the beginning, including Brad Bombardir and Jim Dowd.

The 2004–05 season was canceled due to an NHL lockout. Former Wild player Sergei Zholtok died from a heart condition during a game in Europe. Zholtok died in the arms of Minnesotan and former Wild player Darby Hendrickson.

After the lockout
In the 2005–06 season, the first season after the lockout, Minnesota finished in fifth and last place in the Northwest Division, eight points behind fourth-placed Vancouver Canucks. En route, Marian Gaborik set a new franchise record for goals in a season at 38, and Brian Rolston set a new highest point total by a Wild player in a season at 79. The goaltender controversy between Manny Fernandez and Dwayne Roloson ended when Roloson was traded to the Edmonton Oilers for a first-round pick in the 2006 NHL Entry Draft.

The Wild signed veteran free agents Kim Johnsson, Mark Parrish, Branko Radivojevic and Keith Carney. On the day of the NHL Entry Draft, it traded the 17th overall pick and prospect Patrick O'Sullivan to the Los Angeles Kings for veteran Slovak Pavol Demitra. Niklas Backstrom was the starting goalie for the Wild after previous starter Manny Fernandez sprained his knee on January 20. Fernandez played for the first time since the sprain on March 6 and was removed after allowing three goals in two periods in the Wild's 3–0 loss to the San Jose Sharks. Josh Harding was brought up from the Wild's AHL affiliate, the Houston Aeros, when Fernandez was hurt and remained on Minnesota's roster for the rest of the season as the backup goalie. All-Star winger Marian Gaborik returned from a groin injury in January 2007 and made an immediate impact, bringing a new spark to a lacking offense. The Wild made the playoffs in 2007 for the second time in team history, but were eliminated by the eventual Stanley Cup champions Anaheim Ducks in the opening round. 

The Wild broke numerous franchise records during the 2007–08 season, including most goals and points (Marian Gaborik – 42 goals and 83 points). Also, Jacques Lemaire recorded his 500th career coaching win as the Wild clinched their first-ever Northwest Division title in a 3–1 victory over the Calgary Flames on April 3, 2008. They again faced the Colorado Avalanche in the opening round, and the Wild held home-ice advantage. However, Minnesota came up short, being eliminated in six games by the Avalanche.

During the 2008 off-season, the Wild re-acquired Andrew Brunette from Colorado and traded for defenseman Marek Zidlicky. The Wild also signed free agents Antti Miettinen and Owen Nolan to multi-year deals. There seemed to be a stigma about Jacques Lemaire's defensive system that caused a number of top free agents to avoid the Wild.

Despite winning the Northwest Division the previous season, the Wild fell to ninth place in the Western Conference in 2008–09, missing the playoffs. Much of this was in part due to a lack of scoring and overall team offense, and the injuries to star forward Marian Gaborik, who only played 17 games. Jacques Lemaire, head coach of the Wild since the team's inception in the 2000–01 season, resigned at season's end. General manager Doug Risebrough was later fired, leading to a nearly complete turnover in the Wild's coaching and hockey management staff.

Chuck Fletcher era (2009–2018)

Mikko Koivu years
In the 2009 off-season, Marian Gaborik signed with the New York Rangers during the summer as a free agent. Team owner Craig Leipold hired former Pittsburgh Penguins assistant general manager Chuck Fletcher as general manager. Later that summer, Fletcher selected Todd Richards as head coach. Martin Havlat was signed via free agency after playing the previous three seasons for the Chicago Blackhawks in order to lessen the blow of Gaborik's departure. During the first month of the 2009–10 season, the team announced their first-ever full-time captain, Mikko Koivu. In 2009, Leipold named Matt Majka as chief operating officer of the team.

The 2009–10 and the 2010–11 seasons ended in disappointment for the Wild as they missed the playoffs in both seasons. In the 2010 NHL Entry Draft, the Wild held the ninth overall pick and used it to select Finnish forward Mikael Granlund. The Wild opened the 2010–11 season with two games at the Hartwall Areena in Helsinki against the Carolina Hurricanes. Following the 2010–11 season, the team fired head coach Todd Richards due to the team failing to reach the playoffs in his two seasons as head coach with a 77–71–16 record. Mike Yeo, who coached the Wild's AHL affiliate Houston Aeros to a Western Conference title in 2011, was named the new head coach.

During the 2011 NHL Entry Draft (which the team hosted), the Wild used their tenth overall pick to select Jonas Brodin. The club also created a stir when they traded star defenseman Brent Burns and a second-round pick in 2012 to the San Jose Sharks in exchange for Devin Setoguchi, Charlie Coyle and the 28th overall pick in the 2011 draft, which they used to select Zack Phillips. Later in the off-season, the Wild traded Martin Havlat for Dany Heatley in another blockbuster trade with the Sharks. In November, the team set a franchise record for most wins in one month with 11. Despite a hot start to the season that saw them sitting atop the NHL standings in early December, multiple injuries to key players for extended periods effectively eliminated the team from playoff contention for the fourth consecutive year.

Parise-Suter era
During the 2012 off-season, the team was able to sign top prospect Mikael Granlund to a three-year, entry-level contract. During the 2012 NHL Entry Draft, the team selected Matt Dumba with the seventh overall pick. In the same off-season, the Wild also signed unrestricted free agent winger Zach Parise, a Twin Cities native, and defenseman Ryan Suter to identical 13-year, US$98 million contracts. However, the team's busy off-season was overshadowed by the 2012–13 NHL lockout, which ended in January 2013.

Prior to the 2013 trade deadline, the Wild acquired Jason Pominville from the Buffalo Sabres in exchange for prospects Johan Larsson and Matt Hackett, as well as draft picks. The team reached the post-season for the fourth time in franchise history after a 3–1 win over the Colorado Avalanche on April 27, 2013. After finishing in eighth place in the Western Conference, the Wild lost in five games to the eventual Stanley Cup champion Chicago Blackhawks in the first round of the 2013 playoffs.

The relocation and rebranding of the Atlanta Thrashers as the "new" Winnipeg Jets in 2011 meant Winnipeg was once again Minnesota's second-closest geographical rival after Chicago, and led the NHL to reconsider its divisional alignment. Even before the NHL's return to Winnipeg, Wild management had lobbied repeatedly for a move out of the Northwest Division, where they were the only Central Time Zone team. Among the alignments considered was having the Jets replace the Avalanche in the Northwest, but Wild management strongly objected to this alignment as it would have left them as the only American team in their division. Following protracted negotiations both amongst the owners and with the National Hockey League Players' Association, in 2013, the NHL collapsed its six divisions into four and dissolved the Northwest Division. Consequently, the Wild moved into the Central Division along with the Jets and Avalanche; the Canadian teams from the Northwest moved back to the Pacific Division. The Wild now share their division with not only the Blackhawks but also the Dallas Stars, the Wild's predecessors in Minnesota, and the St. Louis Blues, another major rival of the North Stars during the Norris Division era. Thus, the 2013 Blackhawks–Wild playoff series was seen as the rebirth of the old Chicago–Minnesota rivalry in the NHL.

The 2013–14 regular season for the Wild was the best the team had since the 2007–08 season, good enough to claim the first Wild Card position. Jason Pominville became the Wild's third player in franchise history to reach the 30-goal mark, with Mikko Koivu surpassing Marian Gaborik in all-time points for the club. The Wild battled goaltender problems throughout the entire season. It began with Josh Harding leading the NHL in save percentage, and goals-against average, before being placed on injured reserve for complications with his Multiple sclerosis (MS). Niklas Backstrom also suffered a season-ending injury with abdominal issues. The Wild started five different goalies during the year and dressed seven. At the trade deadline, general manager Chuck Fletcher acquired Ilya Bryzgalov from the Edmonton Oilers in exchange for a fourth-round pick, as well as Matt Moulson and Cody McCormick from Buffalo in exchange for Torrey Mitchell and two-second-round picks in 2014 and 2016. In the playoffs, the team would face Colorado, who won the Central Division. The Wild won the series four games to three with an overtime goal in Game 7 by Nino Niederreiter. The team would then face the defending Stanley Cup champions Chicago, where they were eliminated in six games.

During the 2014 off-season, the Wild signed forward Thomas Vanek as a free agent. In 2015, the Wild clinched the first wild card spot in the West by defeating the Chicago Blackhawks. It then defeated the Central Division champions, the St. Louis Blues, in the first round of the playoffs in six games. In the second round, the Wild were eliminated in a four-game series sweep by Chicago. Following the loss, forward Matt Cooke said, "Our expectations inside this room were a lot higher than [a] second-round series."

In 2016, the Wild set a franchise record with the best win record in the first 41 games of the season. Immediately afterward, they went into a skid, losing the next 13 of 14 games, culminating in the firing of head coach Mike Yeo. Under new interim head coach John Torchetti, the team snapped the losing streak but remained streaky throughout the rest of the season, managing to barely make the playoffs with a total of 87 points, the worst record of any playoff team in the shootout era (since 2005–06). In the first round, the Wild fell to the Central Division champion Dallas Stars in six games. During the 2016 off-season, the Wild signed free agent Eric Staal to a three-year contract. The Wild also hired Bruce Boudreau as their new head coach, replacing interim head coach John Torchetti.

In 2017, the Wild set their new franchise record for points (106), wins (49) and goals for (266). The Wild set a franchise-record 12-game win streak that was snapped on New Year's Eve 2016 by the Columbus Blue Jackets, a team also on a franchise-record win streak at the time. Nevertheless, Minnesota failed to win more than a game in the playoffs, losing in five games to St. Louis. Mikael Granlund led the team in points with 69, while new addition Eric Staal led the team in goals with 28. Mikko Koivu was a finalist for the Frank J. Selke Trophy for best defensive forward, while Granlund was a finalist for the Lady Byng Trophy.

In the 2017 off-season, the Wild experienced significant roster turnover. Erik Haula was lost to the Vegas Golden Knights in the expansion draft (along with prospect Alex Tuch). Winger Jason Pominville and defenseman Marco Scandella were traded to the Buffalo Sabres in exchange for forwards Tyler Ennis and Marcus Foligno. Minnesota native Matt Cullen was signed as a free agent and returned to the Wild to shore up the fourth line (Cullen had previously played in Minnesota from 2010 to 2013). Captain Mikko Koivu signed a two-year extension, ensuring he would remain with the Wild through the 2019–20 season.

Following another 100-point regular season, the Wild matched up with Central Division rival, the Winnipeg Jets, in the first round of the 2018 playoffs. The Jets defeated the Wild in five games, making it three straight seasons in which the Wild failed to advance past the first round. On April 23, shortly following the Wild's exit from the playoffs, owner Leipold announced he had fired general manager Fletcher after nine seasons with the team. Under Fletcher's leadership, the Wild qualified for the playoffs six consecutive years, but failed to advance beyond the second round.

Rebuilding and the Kirill Kaprizov era (2018–present)
On May 21, 2018, Paul Fenton was hired as the third general manager in franchise history. During the 2018–19 season, the Wild struggled to keep up in the ultra-competitive Central Division as they had in previous seasons. Despite a renaissance year from Parise, many key players like Eric Staal and Jason Zucker regressed offensively from the season prior. Many reported that there was dysfunction in the organization, caused by a rift between Fenton, Boudreau and various players, ultimately leading the trading of several core players, such as Mikael Granlund, Charlie Coyle and Nino Niederreiter. The Wild finished the season with 83-points, finishing last in the division and missing the playoffs for the first time since 2012.

In the 2019 off-season, the Wild signed free agent Mats Zuccarello to a five-year contract. On July 30, 2019, Fenton was fired as general manager, just 14 months after being hired to that position. On August 21, 2019, the Wild hired Bill Guerin as the fourth general manager in franchise history. On February 14, 2020, the Wild fired head coach Bruce Boudreau and named Dean Evason as interim head coach. Amid the COVID-19 pandemic, the Wild participated in the best-of-five qualifying round of the 2020 Stanley Cup playoffs, but were eliminated in four games at the hands of the Vancouver Canucks.

Kirill Kaprizov played his first NHL game with the Wild in January 2021, scoring the overtime winner against the Los Angeles Kings during his debut.
On 21 September 2021, Kirill Kaprizov signed a five-year, $45 million contract with the Wild. As a result of the contract, Kaprizov became the highest-paid sophomore player in NHL history. In 2022, the team set franchise season highs in points (113) and wins (53). Kirill Kaprizov set franchise records in points (108), goals (47), and assists (61).

Team information

Jerseys

2000–2007
For its first seven years in the NHL, the Wild wore a uniform of either a green or white jersey with red and gold stripes and the primary logo on the front of the jersey. The shoulder patch was a circle with "Minnesota Wild" read in distinctive lettering from both words. The name and numbering on the green jersey would be gold with red outlining while on the white jersey it was red with gold outlining. In 2003–04, with the NHL reversing the convention regarding the home and road jersey colors, the green jersey became the home jersey while the white one became the road jersey.

2007–2017
In the 2007–08 season, when all jerseys were converted to the new Reebok Edge uniform system, the white jersey was retained and the home jersey replaced with a new one that has a small imprint of the team's primary logo inside a white circle, which is surrounded by the words "Minnesota Wild" in a larger ring against a green background. The rest of the jersey is predominantly red, with additional swatches of green on the sleeves outlined with wheat. The away jersey uses a larger version of the primary logo without the concentric circles on a predominantly white jersey; in 2013, the lettering was updated to match the home and alternate sweaters, at the same time updating the sweater's look to a more traditional design. On August 30, 2009, the team unveiled another third/alternate jersey, which is predominantly green with wheat accents. It says "Minnesota Wild" in script writing across the chest.

On April 4, 2017, the Wild honored the Minnesota North Stars by wearing North Stars jerseys for warm-ups, despite the North Stars history belonging to the Dallas Stars. Martin Hanzal warmed up with number 91, as the North Stars retired number 19 in honor of Bill Masterton.

2017–present
On June 20, 2017, the Wild introduced a new home uniform, as the NHL switched from Reebok to Adidas – a green jersey with their main logo, and a wheat-colored stripe through the center of the jersey. On the arms is a wheat-colored stripe with a smaller red stripe near the top of it. The Wild kept its away jersey design the same. The Wild, along with the rest of the NHL, did not have an alternate jersey for the 2017–18 season. They have not had an alternate jersey since.

Reverse Retro jersey
In the 2020–21 season, the Wild unveiled a "Reverse Retro" jersey in collaboration with Adidas. The uniform was a callback to the late 1970s Minnesota North Stars white uniform, with the Wild logo recolored to match the team's green and gold scheme. This design was reused again in the 2022–23 season, but with green now the base color.

Winter Classic jersey
For the 2022 NHL Winter Classic, the Wild unveiled a special edition jersey inspired by various early Minnesota hockey teams. The jersey is primarily green with red shoulder yoke and red and wheat stripes. The front of the uniforms featured the Minneapolis–Saint Paul (MPLS.–ST. PAUL) identifier around three symbols: a red Minnesota state silhouette with "MN" inside, and two wheat stars referencing Gemini, the twin constellation. Brown gloves and pants were used to reflect early 20th century hockey gear.

Goal horn and songs
The team has had a goal horn each season since its inception. The horn model is a Kahlenberg Q-3A which was given to the team by Daktronics (the same company that made the scoreboard). The Wild are one of the few teams to not blast their goal horn whenever they score in a shootout.
The team's first goal songs were "Born to Be Wild" and "Rock and Roll Part 2" that was used in its inaugural season of 2000–01. The following season, the team removed "Born to Be Wild" but kept "Rock and Roll Part 2" through 2004, before the lockout. After the lockout in 2005, the Wild used a cover of "Rock and Roll Part 1" for the 2005–06 season. For the 2006–07 season, the team changed its goal song to "Crowd Chant" by Joe Satriani shortly after its release. After pop legend and Minneapolis native Prince died in April 2016, the team held a tribute to him at Game 6 of the 2016 Stanley Cup playoffs game against the Dallas Stars, and adopted "Let's Go Crazy" as their goal song. After a fan poll, the team permanently used "Let's Go Crazy" with the goal horn starting in the 2016–17 season. The Wild kept "Crowd Chant" as their win song. For the 2018–19 season, the team brought back "Crowd Chant" as its goal song and "Let's Go Crazy" became the win song, followed by the singing of the team fight song "The State of Hockey". For the pandemic-shortened season, the team used "Jump Around" by House of Pain as their goal song. In the 2021-22 Season, the Wild used "Shout" by  The Isley Brothers as their goal song. "Let's Go Crazy" remains the win song.

Logo

The logo depicts both a forest landscape and the silhouette of a wild animal. The "eye" of the "wild animal" is the north star, in tribute to the departed Minnesota North Stars as well as the state's motto L'Étoile du Nord, meaning "The Star of the North". According to The Good Point, questions surrounding the identity of the animal depicted have sparked debate amongst logo enthusiasts, earning accolades for its unique complexity in North American professional sports.

In 2008, "Nordy" was introduced as the official mascot of the team.

Ownership
The franchise was originally owned by a limited partnership formed by former majority owner Bob Naegele, Jr. of Naegele Sports, LLC in 1997. On January 10, 2008, it was announced the franchise was being sold to former Nashville Predators owner Craig Leipold. The NHL's Board of Governors officially approved Leipold's purchase of Minnesota Sports & Entertainment (MSE) on April 10, 2008. Leipold, a resident of Racine, Wisconsin, completed the sale of the Nashville Predators to a local ownership group on December 7, 2007, a team he owned since the expansion franchise was awarded to Nashville in 1997.

Leipold is the majority owner and principal investor in MSE, a regional sports and entertainment leader that includes the NHL's Minnesota Wild, its AHL affiliate the Iowa Wild of the American Hockey League, Wildside Caterers, 317 on Rice Park and the facility management of Xcel Energy Center and the Saint Paul RiverCentre. He also serves as the team's Governor at NHL Board of Governors' meetings. After purchase of MSE, Mr. Leipold sold the Swarm to John Arlotta. Along with the Wild, the group has year-round management rights of the Xcel Energy Center, and currently has a management contract to manage the adjoining Saint Paul RiverCentre and Roy Wilkins Auditorium; in addition the partnership also owns and operates 317 on Rice Park, which is the former historic Minnesota club.

Community involvement
The Minnesota Wild stay involved in the community through the philanthropic activities of the Minnesota Wild Foundation and its operations to support the game of hockey with events such as Hockey Day Minnesota. It has been celebrated every year since 2007. The Wild are 13-2-1 on Hockey Day Minnesota. Started in 2017, the Wild unveiled a new tradition called This Is Our Ice which encourages Wild fans to bring water from local ponds, lakes and rinks and add it to the Xcel Energy Center ice. Fans can bring water to any regular-season home game and add it to the collection station which will then be added to the ice for the season.

Minor league affiliates
Minnesota currently has two minor league affiliates: the Iowa Wild of the American Hockey League (AHL) and the Iowa Heartlanders of the ECHL. The Iowa Wild is owned by the parent club, who relocated the franchise from Houston in 2013.

Former minor league affiliates

 Alaska Aces
 Allen Americans
 Austin Ice Bats
 Bakersfield Condors
 Cleveland Lumberjacks
 Houston Aeros
 Johnstown Chiefs
 Louisiana IceGators
 Mississippi Sea Wolves
 Orlando Solar Bears
 Quad City Mallards
 Rapid City Rush
 Texas Wildcatters

Season-by-season record
This is a partial list of the last five seasons completed by the Wild. For the full season-by-season history, see List of Minnesota Wild seasons

Note: GP = Games played, W = Wins, L = Losses, T = Ties, OTL = Overtime Losses, Pts = Points, GF = Goals for, GA = Goals against

Players

Current roster

Team captains
Note: The Wild rotated the captaincy for their first nine seasons on a monthly basis among several of its players each season, with some players serving multiple times under Jacques Lemaire. After Todd Richards became head coach for the start of the 2009–10 season, Mikko Koivu, who was the last rotating captain and has had the captaincy three different times in the 2008–09 season, became the franchise's first permanent captain on October 20, 2009.

Rotating, 2000–2009
2000–01
 Sean O'Donnell – October 2000
 Scott Pellerin – November 2000
 Wes Walz – December 2000
 Brad Bombardir – January and February 2001
 Darby Hendrickson – March and April 20012001–02
 Jim Dowd – October 2001
 Filip Kuba – November 2001
 Brad Brown – December 2001 and January 2002
 Andrew Brunette – February, March, and April 2002
2002–03
 Brad Bombardir – October, November 2002, February, March, April, and Playoffs 2003
 Matt Johnson – December 2002
 Sergei Zholtok – January 20032003–04
 Brad Brown – October 2003
 Andrew Brunette – November 2003, March and April 2004
 Richard Park – December 2003
 Brad Bombardir – January 2004
 Jim Dowd – February 2004

2005–06
 Alex Henry – September 2005
 Filip Kuba – November 2005
 Willie Mitchell – December 2005 & January 2006
 Brian Rolston – February 2006
 Wes Walz – March and April 20062006–07
 Brian Rolston – October, November 2006, and January 2007
 Keith Carney – December 2006
 Mark Parrish – February, March, April, and Playoffs 2007
2007–08
 Pavol Demitra – October 2007
 Brian Rolston – November 2007
 Mark Parrish – December 2007
 Nick Schultz – January 2008
 Mikko Koivu – February 2008
 Marian Gaborík – March, April2008–09
 Mikko Koivu – October, November 2008, January 2009, March, and April 2009
 Kim Johnsson – December 2008
 Andrew Brunette – February 2009

Permanent, 2009–present

Mikko Koivu, 2009–2020
Jared Spurgeon, 2021–present

Retired numbers

The NHL retired Wayne Gretzky's No. 99 for all its member teams at the 2000 NHL All-Star Game.

Hall of Famers
The Wild's former head coach Jacques Lemaire was inducted into the Hockey Hall of Fame (in the players category) in 1985.

First-round draft picks

 2000: Marian Gaborik (3rd overall)
 2001: Mikko Koivu (6th overall)
 2002: Pierre-Marc Bouchard (8th overall)
 2003: Brent Burns (20th overall)
 2004: A. J. Thelen (12th overall)
 2005: Benoit Pouliot (4th overall)
 2006: James Sheppard (9th overall)
 2007: Colton Gillies (16th overall)
 2008: Tyler Cuma (23rd overall)
 2009: Nick Leddy (16th overall)
 2010: Mikael Granlund (9th overall)
 2011: Jonas Brodin (10th overall) and Zack Phillips (28th overall)
 2012: Matt Dumba (7th overall)
 2013: None
 2014: Alex Tuch (18th overall)
 2015: Joel Eriksson Ek (20th overall)
 2016: Luke Kunin (15th overall)
 2017: None
 2018: Filip Johansson (24th overall)
 2019: Matthew Boldy (12th overall)
 2020: Marco Rossi (9th overall)
 2021: Jesper Wallstedt (20th overall) and Carson Lambos (26th overall)
 2022: Liam Ohgren (19th overall) and Danila Yurov (24th overall)

Franchise records and leaders

Scoring leaders
The following are the top-ten franchise point-scorers as of the end of the 2021–22 season.

  – current Wild player
Note: Pos = Position; GP = Games Played; G = Goals; A = Assists; Pts = Points; P/G = Points per game;

Individual records

 Most games played with franchise: 1,028, Mikko Koivu (2005–20)
 Most goals in a season: 47, Kirill Kaprizov (2021–22)
 Most assists in a season: 61, Kirill Kaprizov (2021–22)
 Most points in a season: 108, Kirill Kaprizov (2021–22)
 Most penalty minutes in a season: 201, Matt Johnson (2002–03)
 Most points in a season, defenseman: 51, Ryan Suter (2015–16)
 Most points in a season, rookie: 51, Kirill Kaprizov (2020–21)
 Most goals in a game: 5, Marian Gaborik (December 20, 2007, vs. New York Rangers)
 Fastest 3 goals: 11:12, Zach Parise (2015–16)
 Most wins: 194, Niklas Backstrom
 Most wins in a season: 40, Devan Dubnyk (2016–17)
 Most shutouts in a season: 8, Niklas Backstrom (2008–09),
 Best +/- in a season: +41, Alex Goligoski (2021–22)
 Most time on ice per game in a season: 29:25, Ryan Suter, (2013–14)
 Most consecutive starts for goalie: 38, Devan Dubnyk, (January 15, 2015 – April 7, 2015)
 Most consecutive shutouts: 3, Devan Dubnyk

Awards and trophies

 Bill Masterton Memorial Trophy
 Josh Harding: 2012–13
 Devan Dubnyk: 2014–15

Calder Memorial Trophy
 Kirill Kaprizov: 2020–21

 Jack Adams Award
 Jacques Lemaire: 2002–03

 Roger Crozier Saving Grace Award
 Niklas Backstrom: 2006–07
 Dwayne Roloson: 2003–04

 King Clancy Memorial Trophy
 Matt Dumba: 2019–20
 Jason Zucker: 2018–19

 William M. Jennings Trophy
 Manny Fernandez and Niklas Backstrom: 2006–07

 NHL first All-Star team
 Ryan Suter: 2012–13

 NHL second All-Star team
 Devan Dubnyk: 2014–15

 NHL All-Rookie Team
 Jonas Brodin: 2012–13
 Kirill Kaprizov: 2020–21

See also
 List of Minnesota Wild general managers
 List of Minnesota Wild head coaches
 List of Minnesota Wild players
 List of Minnesota Wild broadcasters

References

External links
 
 

 
National Hockey League teams
Ice hockey clubs established in 2000
Sports in Minneapolis–Saint Paul
Sports in Saint Paul, Minnesota
Professional ice hockey teams in Minnesota
Central Division (NHL)
National Hockey League in Minneapolis–Saint Paul
2000 establishments in Minnesota